Abacetus decorsei is a species of ground beetle in the subfamily Pterostichinae. It was described by Tschitscherine in 1901.

References

decorsei
Beetles described in 1901